Dynel Brown Kembo Simeu (born 13 March 2002) is an English professional footballer who plays for League One club Morecambe, on loan from Southampton, as a defender.

Club career
After playing youth football with Chelsea and Southampton, Simeu moved on loan to Carlisle United in January 2022.

On 1 September 2022, Simeu joined Tranmere Rovers on a season long loan. On 5 January 2023, Simeu joined Morecambe for the remainder of the season after ending his loan spell with Tranmere early.

International career
Simeu has represented England at under-17 and under-18 level.

Career statistics

References

2002 births
Living people
English footballers
Chelsea F.C. players
Southampton F.C. players
Carlisle United F.C. players
Tranmere Rovers F.C. players
Morecambe F.C. players
English Football League players
England youth international footballers
Association football defenders
Black British sportspeople
Cameroonian emigrants to England